Landsting elections were held in Denmark on 13 September 1932, with the exception that the electors were elected on 5 September.

Of the seven constituencies the seats representing constituencies number one (Copenhagen), four (Odense and Svendborg County) and six (Hjørring, Aalborg, Thisted, Viborg and Randers County) were up for election.

Results

References

Elections in Denmark
Denmark
Landsting